Michael Samuel Neuberger FRS FMedSci (2 November 1953 – 26 October 2013) was a British biochemist and immunologist.

Biography

Born in Kensington, Michael Samuel Neuberger was the fourth of five children of Albert Neuberger and Lilian Ida (née Dreyfus). He was educated at Westminster School and Trinity College, Cambridge, from where he graduated with a first class honours degree in Natural Sciences in 1974. Neuberger then joined Brian Hartley at Imperial College to study for his PhD. During this time, and at Hartley’s suggestion, he visited the South African biologist Sydney Brenner at the Laboratory of Molecular Biology (LMB) in Cambridge. Their discussions drew Neuberger back to the LMB in 1980 and he remained there for the rest of his career, eventually becoming its deputy director. César Milstein at the LMB recommended that Neuberger spent some time studying immunology with Klaus Rajewsky at the University of Cologne; he spent 18 months there, after his PhD.

Neuberger “was probably most widely known for delineating the role of DNA deamination in immunity through his pioneering work that explained how cytosine deamination drives the somatic hypermutation and class-switch recombination of antibody-encoding genes. Following the identification of activation-induced cytidine deaminase (AID) by Honjo and Durandy as the protein essential for both of those processes, Michael produced a series of seminal papers during 2002 that laid bare the mechanism that had perplexed immunologists for 30 years.”

Family

Michael Neuberger married Gillian Anne (Gill) Pyman, an Australian doctor, on 6 September 1991. They had four children: Saskia, Lydia, Thomas and Benjamin. He died of myeloma, a cancer of antibody-producing cells, at Addenbrooke's Hospital, Cambridge, on 26 October 2013. "At his request, he was buried in a Jewish consecrated grave in the grounds of the Baptist oratory, next to his family weekend home in Suffolk."

Some key papers

Awards and honours
He was elected a Fellow of the Royal Society (FRS) in 1993, “a source of particular pride for his father and a very rare concurrence of father and son as Fellows.” and was awarded their GlaxoSmithKline Prize in 2003. He also received the Novartis medal in 2002 and delivered the Novartis medal lecture, entitled "Antibodies: a Paradigm for the Evolution of Molecular Recognition" on 9 April 2002 at Heriot-Watt University, Edinburgh. In 2013 Neuberger was appointed a Foreign Associate of the National Academy of Sciences.

References 

1953 births
2013 deaths
People educated at Westminster School, London
Alumni of Trinity College, Cambridge
Alumni of Imperial College London
Fellows of Trinity College, Cambridge
Fellows of the Royal Society
Members of the European Molecular Biology Organization
Foreign associates of the National Academy of Sciences
British biochemists
English Jews
Jewish scientists
Michael
English people of German-Jewish descent
Deaths from multiple myeloma